Jiggle television is a term coined by NBC executive Paul Klein to criticize ABC's television production and marketing strategy under Fred Silverman.

Description
Klein referred to ABC's programs as "porn" in order to tap into the 1970s moral panic and anxiety over the spread of pornography, using the neologism to describe the use of female television celebrities moving in loose clothing or underwear in a way in which their breasts or buttocks could be seen to shake, or "jiggle". An American invention, it was used to refer to programs such as Charlie's Angels, Wonder Woman and Three's Company, which used the sexuality of young women as appeal to their audiences.

The programs' plots were often sexist, full of innuendo and suggestive language, and unrealistic in nature. Producers of such series would make sure that its lead actresses would appear in a bikini, one-piece swimsuit, négligée, underwear, or naked under a towel, in each show. Angie Dickinson, star of NBC's Police Woman (1974–1978), which preceded and influenced Charlie's Angels, said that although "essentially a woman’s job is being a woman", by the show's last season she was tired of scenes "where the phone rings while I'm taking a bath".

At the time, the ABC target audience was 18 to 35 years old. Jiggle was also called "tits & ass television" or "T&A" for short and in the 1970s the amount of sex on television increased, as did its ratings, creating social controversies and consequences. Saturday Night Live even ran a fake promo for a Battle of the Network Stars-type competition entitled "Network Battle of the Ts and As".

The term was later taken to new extremes by the late 1980s and throughout the 1990s and early 2000s on such television shows as Baywatch, She Spies, and numerous USA Network series.

Jiggle television series
The term has been used to describe the dramatic television series of Aaron Spelling such as The Love Boat, Fantasy Island, Beverly Hills 90210, Melrose Place, Charmed and others. Jiggle TV is seen as trashy and escapist entertainment. Programs or female performers are often judged by their "jiggle factor" and many, such as Pamela Anderson had their bodies surgically modified to increase it. The term "jiggle-o" is used to describe a character which uses jiggle factor and "jiggle syndrome" is used to discuss the phenomenon as a whole.

See also
 Sexploitation film

References

Television in the United States
Broadcasting in the United States
Neologisms
Television terminology
Pejorative terms